Boti Ann Bliss (born October 23, 1975) is an American film and television actress. Notable roles include her semi-recurring role as Maxine Valera in the television crime drama CSI: Miami. Her other roles include the 2002 film Ted Bundy and 2003 film National Lampoon Presents Dorm Daze.

Personal life
Bliss had an unusual childhood, growing up along with her brother and three sisters in a teepee outside Aspen, Colorado, with her stepfather and her mother, who knitted and sold custom sweaters.

She married film director Blair Hayes in 2010. She gave birth to a boy, Ashby Buck, on March 15, 2011.

Filmography

Film

Television

Video game

References

External links
 
 

Actresses from Colorado
American film actresses
American television actresses
Living people
1975 births
21st-century American women